"Rain and Tears" is a song by the Greek band Aphrodite's Child. The song was included on the band's 1968 debut studio album End of the World, and was released as a single in July 1968 on Mercury. It became a major hit across Europe, reaching number one in France, number two in several other countries, and entering the top 30 in the United Kingdom and West Germany.

The recording was produced by Pierre Sberro.

The song reached no. 2 in the Netherlands, Switzerland and Norway. In Belgium it reached no. 1 in Wallonia and no. 7 in Flanders. French-Italian singer Dalida recorded the song in three different versions. With French lyrics as "Quelques larmes de pluie" for her French-language album Le Temps des Fleurs (Barclay 80378, 1968), with German lyrics as "Regenzeit – Tränenleid" for her German-language album Dalida in Deutsch (Barclay KMLP 316, 1969) and with Italian lyrics as "Lacrime e Pioggia" for her Italian-language album Dalida canta in Italiano (Barclay 80396, 1969).

Track listing 
7" single Mercury 132 501 MFC (1968, Germany, Netherlands, Belgium, France, Spain, Denmark, Sweden, Norway)
7" Single Mercury MF 1039 (1968, UK)
7" single Mercury RF-1 (1968, Australia)
7" single Philips SFL-1178 (1968, Japan)
7" single Mercury 45-4124 (1968, Greece)
 A. "Rain and Tears" (3:08)
 B. "Don't Try to Catch a River" (3:11)

7" single Mercury 6033 014 (Italy, 1976)
7" single Mercury 6173 691 (1979, France)
 A. "Rain and Tears" (3:10)
 B. "I Want To Live" (3:30)
 		 	 
7" single Philips 6060 321 (1982, Belgium)
 A. "Rain And Tears" (3:13)
 B. "Spring, Summer, Winter & Fall" (4:56)

Charts

The Hi-Revving Tongues version

Charts

Awards 
 1969 Loxene Golden Disc – Golden Disc Award (main award; awarded to the best single of the year)

Demis Roussos version (1987) 

A live version by ex-Aphrodite's Child vocalist Demis Roussos was included on his 1987 album The Story of Demis Roussos on the label  . The song was recorded live during "Goud van Oud Live" on April 10, 1987 in Rosmalen.

The recording was also released as a single from that album (in 1987 on BR Music).

See also 
 List of number-one singles of 1968 (France)

References

External links 
 Aphrodite's Child — "Rain and Tears" (1968 single) at Discogs
 Demis Roussos – Rain and Tears" (1987 single) at Discogs

1968 songs
1968 singles
1987 singles
Aphrodite's Child songs
Baroque pop songs
Demis Roussos songs
Mercury Records singles
Songs with music by Vangelis
Songs with lyrics by Boris Bergman